Azan (also Romanized as Āzān and Azān) is a village in Vandadeh Rural District, Meymeh District, Shahin Shahr and Meymeh County, Isfahan Province, Iran. At the 2006 census, its population was 2,578, in 731 families.

References 

Populated places in Shahin Shahr and Meymeh County